Câmpia Turzii is a municipality in Cluj County, Transylvania, Romania, which was formed in 1925 by the union of two villages, Ghiriș (Aranyosgyéres) and Sâncrai (Szentkirály). It was declared a town in 1950 and a city in 1998.

History
The village of Sâncrai was mentioned in a 1219 document as "villa Sancti Regis" ("village of Holy King"), while Ghiriș was first documented in 1292 as "Terra Gerusteleke" ("Gerusteleke", literally meaning "plot of Gerus" in Hungarian).

Michael the Brave was murdered by agents of Giorgio Basta at the current location of Câmpia Turzii on August 9, 1601.

Câmpia Turzii is the "city of adoption" of Toulouse and a sister city of Siemianowice Śląskie.

Population

The population has evolved as follows since 1784:
1784: Ghiriș: 565; Sâncrai: 472
1850: Ghiriș: 1,168; Sâncrai: 487
1910: Ghiriș: 1,815; Sâncrai: 704
1930 census: 4,124
1948 census: 6,310
1956 census: 11,518
1977 census: 22,418
2002 census: 26,823
2011 census: 22,223

Military activity
The city is home to the Romanian Air Force's RoAF 71st Air Base, and during the NATO Summit of 2008, the 323rd Air Expeditionary Wing of the United States Air Force. F-15s from RAF Lakenheath in the United Kingdom flew out during the summit to augment air defence forces for the event.

In April 2015, a U.S. Air Force group of A-10 Thunderbolt attack aircraft stationed in Germany arrived at the RoAF 71st Air Base to take part in exercises with the Romanian Air Force.

Natives

Mihai Adam, footballer
Andra, singer
Sebastian Cojocnean, footballer
Andrei Cordoș, footballer
Andrei Coroian, footballer
Cozmin Gușă, physicist, journalist, and politician
Iuliu Jenei, footballer
Cosmin Mărginean, footballer
Teodor Murășanu, writer and teacher
Mircea Rus, footballer
Virginia Ruzici, tennis player
Ioan Sabău, footballer
Cristian Silvășan, footballer
Cosmin Văsîie, footballer

References

 
Populated places in Cluj County
Localities in Transylvania
Cities in Romania
Populated places established in 1925
Monotowns in Romania